The Cincinnati Type Foundry was a manufacturer of typefaces, matrices and other type-related equipment in Cincinnati, Ohio, established in 1826 by John P. Foote and Oliver Wells. In 1892 it was merged into American Type Founders.

References

Further reading
 Specimen of modern and light face printing types and ornaments, cast at the Cincinnati Type Foundery. 1834
 Cincinnati Type Foundry Co's specimen and price-list. 1870
 
 
 The seventeenth book of specimens from the Cincinnati Type Foundry. 1888

External links

 Smithsonian. Cincinnati Type Foundry Army Press, first manufactured in 1862

Images

Letterpress font foundries of the United States
Manufacturing companies based in Cincinnati
Defunct companies based in Cincinnati
Manufacturing companies established in 1826
1826 establishments in Ohio
American companies established in 1826